Mathanda Appachu was an Indian warrior and freedom fighter. He was an officer in Chikka Vira Rajendra's army. He was from Bollumad village in Beppunad in Kodagu. He was also known as Madanta Appachu.

In 1834, the British East India Company invaded Kodagu (then known as Coorg). The British army consisted of more than 6000 men and was divided into four columns who entered Kodagu from different directions. On third April, one of the four columns entered Kodagu via Kodlipet and marched towards Haringi. They came to a village guarded by a stockade. This village was under the charge of Mathanda Appachu and his men. The Column was led by Major Bird. For four and a half hours, the British tried to pass the village but were unable to. The British came under heavy firing. Col Mill, Ensign Robertson and Ensign Babington were among the 48 killed in the British force. 118 others were wounded in the invading column. No casualties were reported from Mathanda Appachu's side. Major Bird led his remaining men and quickly retreated several miles to try another route.  

On behalf of Chikka Vira Rajendra the Raja, Diwan Lakshminarayana and Mahomed Taker Khan made peace with the British on 4th April and Diwan Bopu surrendered on 5th April. Col Fraser was led into Madikeri fort on 6th April. On 10th April, the Raja and his wives left Nalknad palace and entered Madikeri to surrender to the British.

See also
 Coorg War

References

1834 in India
Military history of British India
Wars involving the British East India Company
History of Karnataka
Coorg
Conflicts in 1834
April 1834 events
People from Kodagu district
Kodava people
Indian independence movement
History of social movements
History of India
Indian revolutionaries